Massonia triflora is a species of flowering plant in the family Asparagaceae, native to the western Cape Provinces of South Africa. As its synonym Massonia citrina it has gained the Royal Horticultural Society's Award of Garden Merit as an ornamental. Some authorities considered it to be a synonym of Massonia depressa, the hedgehog lily.

References

triflora
Endemic flora of South Africa
Flora of the Cape Provinces
Plants described in 1931
Taxa named by Robert Harold Compton